is one of the world's top kinbakushi (Japanese bondage artists).

Born in 1954 he became interested in rope bondage at an early age inspired by paintings of the legendary bondage artist Seiu Ito and the works of Akira Minomura.

His career began in the 1970s when he worked for SM magazines like SM Select and SM Fan. He also did the bondage for movies, including the erotic romance Angel Guts: "Akai Nawa Hateru Made" (Until the Red Rope Runs Out), directed by Suzuki Junichi in 1987. In 2004, he did the rope work and appeared in the movie Flower and Snake, starring Aya Sugimoto and directed by Takashi Ishii. This was a remake of the 1974 film Flower and Snake, a soft-core classic based on the SM novel by Oniroku Dan. He is also featured in Bakushi, a documentary about the art of Japanese bondage, by Ryūichi Hiroki.

Today Arisue lives in Tokyo and works as a kinbaku performer, tutor and author, occasionally giving workshops abroad.

Works
 Kinbakushi A's Ecstasy And Gloom, Ohta Publishing, 2008
 Arisue's Kinbaku Theory and Practices, Sanwa Publishing, 2008
 Kinbaku Mind and Techniques 1, Jugoya, 2009
 Kinbaku Mind and Techniques 2 (Floor Works 1), Jugoya, 2009

References

External links
Arisue Go Kinbaku night in Japan

Living people
Year of birth missing (living people)
Bondage riggers
Japanese erotic artists
Japanese writers
BDSM writers